John Siddle Williams House, also known as the Hickory County Museum , is a historic home located at Hermitage, Hickory County, Missouri, USA. It was built about 1855, and is a two-story, "L"-shaped, brick I-house. It rests on a stone foundation and features double galleries on the front and rear facades. It became the Hickory County Museum in 1976.

It was listed on the National Register of Historic Places on September 27, 1980.

References

History museums in Missouri
Houses on the National Register of Historic Places in Missouri
Houses completed in 1855
Buildings and structures in Hickory County, Missouri
National Register of Historic Places in Hickory County, Missouri